Pawelek or Pawełek is a surname. Notable people with the surname include:

Joe Pawelek (born 1986), American football linebacker
Kazimierz Pawełek (1936–2017), Polish journalist and politician
Kim Pawelek Brantly (born 1974), Vietnamese-American middle- and long-distance runner
Mariusz Pawełek (born 1981), Polish footballer 
Mark Pawelek (born 1986), American baseball player
Ted Pawelek (1919–1964), American baseball player